Taghkanic is a town in Columbia County, New York, United States. The town is in the south-central part of the county. The population was 1,231, at the 2020 US census, down from 1,310 at the 2010 census. "Taghkanic" is an older spelling of "Taconic".

History 

Settlement began before 1700, while the region was part of Livingston Manor. The town was formed from the town of Livingston in 1803 as the town of Granger.

Geography
The town shares its name with Taghkanic Creek, a tributary of Claverack Creek, which runs through the town in a U shape from the northeastern corner to the northwestern corner. The town also shares its name with the Taghkanic or Taconic Mountains in the eastern section of the township.

The Taconic State Parkway passes through the town.

Demographics

As of the census of 2000, there were 1,118 people, 461 households, and 325 families residing in the town.  The population density was 27.9 people per square mile (10.8/km2).  There were 713 housing units at an average density of 17.8 per square mile (6.9/km2).  The racial makeup of the town was 98.48% white, 0.63% African American, 0.18% Native American, 0.09% Asian, 0.09% from other races, and 0.54% from two or more races. Hispanic or Latino of any race were 1.07% of the population.

There were 461 households, out of which 24.1% had children under the age of 18 living with them, 60.7% were married couples living together, 6.9% had a female householder with no husband present, and 29.5% were non-families. 23.6% of all households were made up of individuals, and 9.1% had someone living alone who was 65 years of age or older.  The average household size was 2.39 and the average family size was 2.82.

In the town, the population was spread out, with 20.8% under the age of 18, 3.8% from 18 to 24, 25.8% from 25 to 44, 30.8% from 45 to 64, and 19.0% who were 65 years of age or older.  The median age was 45 years. For every 100 females, there were 103.6 males.  For every 100 females age 18 and over, there were 103.7 males.

The median income for a household in the town was $45,804, and the median income for a family was $51,908. Males had a median income of $31,875 versus $27,375 for females. The per capita income for the town was $29,850.  About 6.9% of families and 9.1% of the population were below the poverty line, including 13.0% of those under age 18 and 2.8% of those age 65 or over.

Communities and locations in Taghkanic 
Churchtown – a hamlet at the town line in the northeastern part of the town.
East Taghkanic – a hamlet in the eastern section of the town, southeast of Taghkanic hamlet.
Lake Taghkanic State Park – the northern part of the state park is at the southern town line.
New Forge – a hamlet in the southern part of the town.  The House at New Forge was added to the National Register of Historic Places in 1987.
Taghkanic – eponymous hamlet near the center of the town.
West Taghkanic – a hamlet southwest of Taghkanic hamlet. It was formerly called "Millers Corners" and "Laphams".

References

External links
 Town of Taghkanic official website
 Some historical data about Taghkanic, NY

Towns in Columbia County, New York